Ian Coggins (born 27 April 1969) was a Sri Lankan cricketer. He was a right-handed batsman and wicket-keeper who played for Moors Sports Club. He was born in Colombo. Coggins made a single first-class appearance for the side, during the 1994–95 season, against Antonians Sports Club. From the upper-middle order, he scored 5 runs in the first innings in which he batted, and 11 runs in the second.

In February 2020, he was named in Sri Lanka's squad for the Over-50s Cricket World Cup in South Africa. However, the tournament was cancelled during the third round of matches due to the coronavirus pandemic.

References

External links
Ian Coggins at Cricket Archive 

1969 births
Living people
Sri Lankan cricketers
Moors Sports Club cricketers